Garrison Creek is a stream in Lafayette County in the U.S. state of Missouri.

Garrison Creek has the name of the local Garrison family.

See also
List of rivers of Missouri

References

Rivers of Lafayette County, Missouri
Rivers of Missouri